Equinox is a Norwegian thrash metal band from Fredrikstad that started in 1987.
The initial band members were Grim Stene (guitar/vocals), Ragnar 'Raggen' Westin (drums) and Skule Stene (bass guitar) who were all ex-Rebellion members. In 1988 Tommy Skarning joined as a second guitarist.
On the Labyrinth album Tommy was no longer with the band, and Raggen was exchanged with Jørn Wangsholm. The band broke up in 1995.

The 15 November 2017 Equinox announced that they were doing an exclusive comeback concert at the Tons of Rock Festival in Halden with the original band members.

Discography
 What the Fuck Is This 1988 Laughing Deer Productions
 Auf Wiedersehen 1989 BMG
 Skrell EP 1990 BMG
 The Way to Go 1990 BMG
 NUH! EP 1992 BMG
 Xerox Success 1992 BMG
 Labyrinth 1995 Progress

Norwegian thrash metal musical groups
Musical groups established in 1987
1987 establishments in Norway
Musical groups disestablished in 1995
1995 disestablishments in Norway
Musical groups from Fredrikstad